D.D. Beauchamp (August 25, 1908 – March 20, 1969) was an American screenwriter for film and TV.

Filmography

Films

Television

References

External links

D.D. Beauchamp at BFI

1908 births
1969 deaths
20th-century American screenwriters